Keith McCarter is a Scottish sculptor, with several works on public display.

Career 

McCarter was born in Edinburgh in 1936 and studied at Edinburgh College of Art.  He received an Andrew Grant Scholarship which allowed him to travel through Europe including Scandinavia, in 1960 and 1961. He then lived in America until 1963, working for Steuben Glass as a designer. Returning to the UK, he was from 1964 to 1968 a visiting lecturer at Hornsey College of Art.

He is known for his abstract sculptural relief in concrete, Celestial, which was commissioned by, and from 1969 to 2011 adorned the Southampton headquarters of, Ordnance Survey. As of December 2022, it was stored in a field in Milton Keynes, while a new home for it was sought.

As his career progressed, he switched from working in concrete to metal.

Several of his works of public art are on display.

Personal life 
McCarter's brother Graham also studied art, at Guildford Art College. In later like, McCarter became a full-time carer for his wife, Brenda. She died in 2022.

Works

References

External links 

 

Living people
1936 births
Scottish sculptors
People from Edinburgh
Edinburgh College of Art
Abstract sculptors